St. Laurence High School is a co-educational, STEM-based high school founded in 1961. Located in the Roman Catholic Archdiocese of Chicago, the school is conducted by the Congregation of Christian Brothers and is named for the Irish Saint Laurence O'Toole.

The school is located in the southwest Chicago suburb of Burbank, Illinois, adjacent to the property of the former Queen of Peace High School, a private, all-female Catholic high school that merged with St. Laurence in 2017.

History
St. Laurence High School was founded by the Congregation of Christian Brothers as a boys' school. With the closure of its neighboring sister school Queen of Peace High School, a girls' school run by the Dominican Sisters, it was announced that St. Laurence would become co-educational from the 2017-2018 academic year onwards and accommodate transferring female students.

Due to construction delays on the Queen of Peace High School building, Queen of Peace High School classes were held in the D and E wings of the St. Laurence building for one school year while construction on Queen of Peace High School was completed.

Classes
At the start of the 2013 school year, St. Laurence High School became a STEM school. The school incorporates spirituality and leadership in their STEM program. St. Laurence High School also pioneers "Career Explorer" courses.

All classrooms are located on the first floor of the school. Classrooms are divided among four of the five academic wings, labeled A, B, C, D, and E.

In 2021, St. Laurence High School began an International Baccalaureate diploma program, making it one of 37 Illinois high schools to offer the program, as well as one of only three Catholic high schools in the state.

Athletics
St. Laurence High School is a member of the Chicago Catholic League (CCL) and the Illinois High School Association (IHSA). St. Laurence sponsors interscholastic teams in baseball, basketball, bowling, cross country, football, golf, soccer, tennis, lacrosse, track and field, volleyball, and wrestling, which compete in IHSA sponsored state championship tournaments.  The school also sponsors an ice hockey team.

The following teams have finished in the top four at the IHSA state tournament in their respective class.

 Baseball: 2nd place (2019), 3rd place (1993, 2017), Semifinalist (1987)
 Basketball: 4th place (1976–1977)
 Football: Champions (1976–1977), Runner-Up (1979–1980)
 Wrestling: Champions (1989–1990)

Notable alumni
 Brent Bowers: Major League Baseball outfielder with the Baltimore Orioles
 Kevin Bracken: United States team member in Greco-Roman wrestling at the 2000 Summer Olympics
 Jimmy Dore: Comedian and political commentator
 Jim Dwyer: Major League Baseball outfielder with the 1983 World Series champion Baltimore Orioles
 Tim Grunhard: NFL All-Pro center with the Kansas City Chiefs
 James Hickey: retired United States Army colonel who was involved in the capture of Iraqi dictator Saddam Hussein in December, 2003
Daniel Robert Jenky: Bishop of the Roman Catholic Diocese of Peoria; rector of the Basilica of the Sacred Heart, Indiana, at Notre Dame University; chaplain of Notre Dame's last football team to win a national championship
 Kevin J. O'Connor: film and TV actor (The Mummy, Van Helsing, Steel Magnolias, Color of Night, There Will Be Blood)
 Steve Puidokas: professional basketball player in Europe and  Pac-12 Conference Men's Basketball Hall of Honor member
 Stan Smagala: NFL safety with the Dallas Cowboys
 Jim Stack: NBA executive with the Minnesota Timberwolves and Chicago Bulls
 John Tumpane: Major League Baseball umpire
 Jeff Vintar: motion picture screenwriter (I, Robot)

References

External links
Official website
SouthtownStar: "A happy state of mind in Burbank" - Article on 2007 football resurgence of St. Laurence and Reavis

Roman Catholic Archdiocese of Chicago
Catholic secondary schools in Illinois
Congregation of Christian Brothers secondary schools
Boys' schools in the United States
Educational institutions established in 1961
Private high schools in Cook County, Illinois
Burbank, Illinois
1961 establishments in Illinois